Goose Island is a vanishing island located in the Potomac River in the southwest quadrant of Washington, D.C., in the United States. It is a rarely above-water mudflat located at the mouth of Oxon Creek, roughly between Oronoco Bay in Alexandria and Marbury Point (Shepherds Landing), now part of the Blue Plains water treatment plant.

National Oceanic and Atmospheric Administration nautical charts indicate that Goose Island sits within a shallow area, extending south past the Woodrow Wilson Bridge into Maryland, that is used to deposit dredging spoils.

External links

NOAA Nautical Chart 12285, showing vicinity

Islands of the Potomac River
River islands of Washington, D.C.
Southwest (Washington, D.C.)